Phaniola implicata is a species of moth of the family Tortricidae. It is found in Bahia, Brazil.

References

Moths described in 2003
Cochylini